Phil Gallagher is  a British children's television presenter who is best known for playing the title character in the CBeebies children's television show Mister Maker.

Early life 
Gallagher attended Rainham Mark Grammar School in Rainham, Kent, and Canterbury Christ Church University.

Career 
Gallagher started his career as presenter and sports reporter on BBC Radio Kent. He was a performer and puppeteer on Playhouse Disney and also provided characters and voices for Studio Disney.

From 2003 until 2005, Gallagher presented Diggin' It on GMTV. During 2006, he was a regular character on Mighty Truck of Stuff as 'Pablo', and was also the voice-over for Channel 4's Unanimous.

Gallagher has appeared as the title character in Mister Maker since 2007. He also appeared in 2 episodes of Bear Behaving Badly as the Robot Rat Catcher and the Mummy. Since 2009, he has also played the role of 'Mr Liker Biker' in Grandpa in My Pocket.

Gallagher often performs in pantomimes. In 2006, he appeared as Wishee Washee in Aladdin at the Theatre Royal in Winchester. In 2007, he appeared as Silly Billy (Jack's brother) in Jack and the Beanstalk, again at the Theatre Royal in Winchester. In 2008, he appeared as Buttons in Cinderella at the Opera House, Buxton, Derbyshire. In 2009 he played alongside George Takei in the title role of Aladdin at the Central Theatre in Chatham, Kent, and in 2011 as Muddles in Snow White and the Seven Dwarfs in St Albans with Toyah Willcox who played the Evil Queen. In 2013, he returned to Jack and the Beanstalk, playing Billy Trot in a production at the Marlowe Theatre, Canterbury alongside Samantha Womack.

In 2009, Gallagher was nominated for the BAFTA Children's Awards as Best Presenter for his role in Mister Maker.

Filmography

References 

English male television actors
English television presenters
English male voice actors
Living people
People educated at Rainham Mark Grammar School
Year of birth missing (living people)